Jane Paulet née Savage, Marchioness of Winchester (1608-1631) was an English aristocrat, and her death was the subject of several poems.

She was a daughter of Thomas Savage, 1st Viscount Savage of Rocksavage and Elizabeth Darcy.

She married John Paulet, 5th Marquess of Winchester in 1623. Her surviving child Charles Paulet, 1st Duke of Bolton was born in 1629. 

James Howell claimed to have taught her Spanish, and 1626 translated a sonnet for her into Spanish, in the same metre so that it could be sung to the same tune.

She died during childbirth on 15 April 1631 at Basing House. She had an "imposthume", an infected swelling of the mouth and cheek which had developed from a toothache, which caused a fever. Her child was stillborn during an intervention for the infection. The circumstances of her death at Easter time in the presence of house guests including her grandfather Lord Rivers and her three sisters were noted in letters written by the Duchess of Buckingham, the Countess of Westmorland, and John Pory.

John Pory included a brief account of her death in a letter to Thomas Puckering, "The Lady Marquess of Winchester, daughter to the Lord Viscount Savage, had an impostume upon her cheek lanced; the humour fell down into her throat, and quickly dispatched her, being big with child, whose death is lamented as well in respect of other her virtues, as that she was inclining to become a protestant".

John Milton, Ben Jonson, Walter Colman, and others wrote epitaphs.

Two portraits of Jane Paulet survive, by Gilbert Jackson, dated 1627 and 1632.

References

External links
 John Milton, An Epitaph on the Marchioness of Winchester
 Ben Jonson, Elegy on the Lady Jane Pawlet
 Toothache and the Death of Jean Savage Paulet, Marchioness of Winchester: Objects & the Archive

17th-century English women
1608 births
1631 deaths
Deaths in childbirth
People from Runcorn
Winchester
Savage family